In coding theory, alternant codes form a class of parameterised error-correcting codes which generalise the BCH codes.

Definition
An alternant code over GF(q) of length n is defined by a parity check matrix H of alternant form Hi,j = αjiyi, where the αj are distinct elements of the extension GF(qm), the yi are further non-zero parameters again in the extension GF(qm) and the indices range as i from 0 to δ − 1, j from 1 to n.

Properties
The parameters of this alternant code are length n, dimension ≥ n − mδ and minimum distance ≥ δ + 1.
There exist long alternant codes which meet the Gilbert–Varshamov bound.

The class of alternant codes includes 
 BCH codes
 Goppa codes
 Srivastava codes

References 
 

Error detection and correction
Finite fields
Coding theory